Dactylotula altithermella is a species of moth of the family Gelechiidae. It is found in Spain, France, Austria, the Czech Republic and Hungary. The wingspan is 10–12 mm. The forewings are white, sprinkled with slaty bluish grey scales. The hindwings are bluish grey.

References

Moths described in 1903
Apatetrini
Moths of Europe